Outcome factorisation is a method for quantifiably comparing outcomes generated by similar activities, used in quantitative research.
This process of measurement is central to quantitative research because it provides a fundamental and measurable connection between empirical observation and mathematical expression of the quantitative relationships.
It has been used in various areas of social sciences and has been the basis of many market research projects.

Calculation
One method of calculating outcome factorisation is as follow:
 Prepare a qualitative questionnaire asking the respondents to give a score of between −10 and +10.
 Average out the scores. A weighted average can be used. Calculate the average of all the questionnaires from respondents
 Calculate the inverse natural logarithm. This is the outcome factorisation (OF). This can be produced on excel spreadsheets by using the EXP(..) function.
 This number can be divided by the cost (per day) to create the outcome factorisation per unit of currency – UK £ or US dollars.

History
The use of such a tool for epistemology and ontology in social science research has been referred to by Pierre Bourdieu. The nature of the outcome results gives a fine balance between the Positivist and Interpretivist paradigms, Positivism and Interpretivism.

The original theories of outcome factorisation are probably derived from discussions at the Albach Symposium in the 1960s which were held in the honor of Erwin Schrödinger.

References

Quantitative research